Heart London is a regional radio station owned and operated by Global Radio as part of the Heart network. It broadcasts a hot adult contemporary radio format. Across London and its neighbouring counties, it can be heard on 106.2 MHz.

History
In 1994 Chrysalis Radio was awarded a London-wide licence to broadcast "soft AC" music, winning the licence as "Crystal FM".

The name was changed to Heart 106.2 which began test transmissions in August 1995, prior to the station launch on 5 September. This included live broadcasts of WPLJ from New York City.

In 1996 the Heart programming format saw the "soft AC" music replaced with a generally more neutral rock 'n' roll playlist.

On 25 June 2007, Chrysalis Records announced that Heart along with its sister stations The Arrow, Sky News Radio, LBC and Galaxy were to be sold for £170 million to Global Radio.

On 28 April 2008, Heart London began simulcasting most of its programmes on Heart West Midlands, thereby beginning a roll-out of Heart London to other stations and by 2010, local programming was reduced to seven hours on weekdays and four hours on Saturday and Sunday.

Availability
In addition to FM, the station is available on DAB digital radio in London, and across the UK on Freesat, Sky, Freeview, TalkTalk TV and Virgin Media. The station is also available on MXR regional DAB multiplexes in the North West, North East, the Severn Estuary and Yorkshire, as well as on Switch Digital in central Scotland, having replaced Heart Digital. Until April 2006, the station could also be listened to worldwide through its Internet stream. However, according to the website, the station has withdrawn this facility outside the UK due to licensing laws.

Current notable presenters
Lindsey Russell
Amanda Holden
Jamie Theakston
Ashley Roberts
Kelly Brook
Jason King
Dev Griffin
Toby Anstis
Zoe Hardman
Mark Wright
Yasmin Evans
Emma Bunton
Lucy Horobin
Scarlette Douglas

News
Global's London headquarters broadcasts hourly news bulletins 24 hours a day, including local news bulletins from 0600 to 1900 on weekdays and 0600 to noon at weekends. During off peak hours, the hourly bulletins are from the national network, except during The Official Big Top 40.

See also 
 Heart East
 Heart South

References

External links
 

Adult contemporary radio stations in the United Kingdom
Radio stations in London
Radio stations established in 1995
London